Sawfar, also spelled as Saoufar or Sofar) is a village in the Aley District of the Mount Lebanon Governorate in Lebanon. It is situated at an altitude of 1,320 meters and next to the main road linking Beirut with Damascus in Syria. 

Sawfar has a population of about 3,000 people, most of whom are Druze. During the summer months, the population can increase to around 15,000 due to tourism. It gains its importance from its strategic and panoramic views overlooking the Matn District and the Lamartine Valley.

The village is the summer headquarters of the French Embassy in Lebanon. It is home to Chateau Bernina, a well-known hotel tucked in the green side of northern Sawfar, which overlooks the Lamartine Valley and Kneise Mountain. The Grand Sofar Hotel, a favorite destination for royals and dignitaries from 1892 to 1975, was reopened as an art exhibition venue in 2018.

In the winter, Sawfar receives significant snowfall, which can exceed one meter high after particularly heavy storms. Temperatures usually drop below zero during the months of December and January. The village experiences moderate and dry summers, making it a popular destination for tourists wishing to escape the extreme summer heat and humidity common to other areas in the region.

See also
Mudeirej Bridge
Grand Sofar Hotel

References

External links
Saoufar, Localiban

Populated places in Aley District
Druze communities in Lebanon